Dead to the World is the first live video album by American rock band Marilyn Manson, released on February 10, 1998, on VHS, documenting the infamous tour of the same name. It contains primarily live performances but delves into backstage and archival footage of the band.

Notable features are: extensive protests by right-wing Christian groups; spoken relations of meaning and intent by Manson himself; and the brutal, immense theatrics presented by the band in the live setting. Based on Antichrist Superstar, this video features six songs from the album as well as songs from earlier releases Portrait of an American Family and Smells Like Children. Naturally, this tour reflected the album upon which it was built.

Blurb 
 
The controversial events from the Antichrist Superstar tour serve as the backdrop for this amazing document, all as seen through the video eye of the band's own cameraman. The picketing zealots, the fulminating moralists, the disingenuous politicians, the tens of thousands who came to see for themselves and, of course, gazing outward from the very heart of the storm, Manson himself. One hour of live concert performances intercut with behind the scene and backstage footage that will help you to understand what it must have been like to be at the center of these extraordinary occurrences.[MM]

Track listing
All tracks by Marilyn Manson
 "Angel with the Scabbed Wings"
 "Lunchbox"
 "Kinderfeld"
 "Sweet Dreams (Are Made of This)"
 "Apple of Sodom" (with Rasputina)
 "Antichrist Superstar"
 "The Beautiful People"
 "My Monkey"
 "Irresponsible Hate Anthem"
 "Rock 'n' Roll Nigger"
 "1996" (spoken)

Personnel 
Marilyn Manson — vocals, guitar, pan flute
Twiggy Ramirez — bass
Madonna Wayne Gacy — keyboards
Ginger Fish — drums
Zim Zum — guitar

Re-releases 
Manson stated in November 2005 that he was interested in re-releasing Dead to the World and its follow-up God Is in the T.V. on DVD.  Nothing has surfaced so far.

Certifications

References

External links 
 

1998 live albums
1998 video albums
Live video albums
Marilyn Manson (band) video albums
Nothing Records video albums